Adams, officially the Municipality of Adams, is a 5th class municipality in the province of Ilocos Norte, Philippines. According to the 2020 census, it has a population of 2,189 people.

Geography 
Adams is located in the northern part of the province. It is bordered by Pagudpud in the north, by Santa Praxedes, Cagayan in the northeast, Calanasan, Apayao in the east, Dumalneg in the west and Vintar in the south.

Road access to the municipality is mainly from Barangay Pancian in Pagudpud and used to be only accessible to motorcycles. Improvements to the road and new concrete bridges built by the provincial government of Ilocos Norte made the town accessible to all vehicles as of 2020, with plans to convert the provincial road into a national highway under the Department of Public Works and Highways.

Adams' villages are far from each other, with Sitio Bucarot as the farthest, located on the side of the mountain away from the población. It takes about three hours of hiking to get there.

Sitio Bucarot is still disputed territory between Adams and Calanasan, Apayao. Due to this, the place has government buildings from both municipalities.

Barangays 
Adams is composed of only one barangay, Adams Proper. This barangay is headed by elected officials: Barangay Captain, Barangay Council, whose members are called Barangay Councilors. All are elected every three years.

Climate

Demographics

Adams' population is a mixture of different tribes like Ilocanos, Yapayaos, Immallods, Kankanaeys, and Bago.

Economy 

Local products produced in Adams include:
Saplid - local for soft broom
Wine - just like Tapuey or rice wine
Tropical wine - it depends on the season. Example of fruit wine is Bugnay Wine.

Government 
Adams, belonging to the first congressional district of the province of Ilocos Norte, is governed by a mayor designated as its local chief executive and by a municipal council as its legislative body in accordance with the Local Government Code. The mayor, vice mayor, and the councilors are elected directly by the people through an election which is being held every three years.

Elected officials

Municipal seal 

The seal and its white background speaks of the people's simple way of living; it further suggests that their lifestyle is not blemished nor corrupted by civilization and modernization.

The shield was derived from the Provincial Seal of Ilocos Norte. The mountain range and the verdant field and river show the topography of the place as a potential source of wealth and livelihood. The mountain ranges also symbolizes the lofty ideals and the high hopes of the people for making Adams a progressive and attractive place to live in.

Attractions
Adams has 18 waterfalls and 10 hanging bridges, including:
Maligligay Falls
Mareprep Falls
Anuplig Falls - considered the premier falls in Adams
Inuwayan Falls
Cabacan Falls
Anat Falls
Kanayupan Falls
Abbas Falls
Aki Falls - Y-shaped falls
Adams' Hanging Bridge - the longest hanging bridge in Ilocos Norte
Bolo River - known for its crystal waters
Avis Falls

Culture

Cuisine 
Local food include balbollosa (wild eggplant), ubog (rattan shoots), chicken with cardis, aba (gabi), kukutit (crushed crablets), fried frogs, kiwet (eel) and salads. There's also tapuey (rice wine) and Bugnay (fruit wine).

Festivals 
Tadek-Bagat Festival is celebrated on April 16–18 where it presents songs and dances of the different tribes of Adams.
Foundation Day of Adams is celebrated annually on May 16.

References

External links

[ Philippine Standard Geographic Code]
Philippine Census Information
Local Governance Performance Management System

Municipalities of Ilocos Norte
Mountain resorts in the Philippines